James Maloney may refer to:
James Maloney (Canadian politician) (born 1963 or 1964)
Jim Maloney (politician) (1901–1982), Australian Labor politician and diplomat
James H. Maloney (born 1948), United States Congressman
James Maloney (Ontario politician) (1905–1961), Canadian politician
James W. Maloney (1909–1984), American racehorse trainer
Jim Maloney (born 1940), American baseball player
James Maloney (rugby league) (born 1986), Australian rugby league footballer

See also
James Mahony (1810–1879), Irish artist and engraver
James Malone (disambiguation)
James Moloney (born 1954), Australian children's author